Kadhar is a village and union council of Mandi Bahauddin District in the Punjab Province of Pakistan. It is located at an altitude of 203 metres (669 feet). It lies about 2 km from Phalia in southern side. It is a developing village. Government High School for Boys, a Rural Health center and a Union council office are some sites of village.

References

Union councils of Mandi Bahauddin District
Villages in Mandi Bahauddin District